Men in White,  is a 2007 Singaporean horror comedy film directed by Kelvin Tong. Filming for the film began in late 2006. It is mostly in Mandarin and English, and has some Hokkien. It satirises several aspects of Singaporean life.

Plot
Five Singaporeans, a housewife, a gangster girl, two rappers and a badminton player, die on the same day and become ghosts.

Cast
 Shaun Chen
 Ling Lee
 Alice Lim
 Ben Yeong
 Xavier Teo
 David Aw
 Benjamin Heng
 Ix Shen
 Wang Xiong
 Lawrence Wong as Ah Huat
 Dennis Chew as himself

Release
A preview of the film was held on 5 June 2007 for charity. The film was released in theatres in Japan on 6 June. The film had an underwhelming performance at the box office.

Reception
Jeanmarie Tan of The New Paper gave the movie two-and-a-half stars out of five. Jiang Jinyu of Lianhe Zaobao criticised the film's characters, while praising the acting. Hong Mingua of Lianhe Zaobao also gave the film a negative review. Li Yiyun of Lianhe Zaobao gave the film two stars out of five for entertainment and two stars out of five for art. Geoffrey Eu of The Business Times rated the movie C-.

References

External links 
 

2007 films
2007 comedy horror films
Singaporean comedy horror films